Paratype trifera is a moth in the subfamily Arctiinae. It was described by Francis Walker in 1869. It is found in Brazil.

References

Lithosiini
Moths described in 1869